Jessica Vall Montero (born 22 November 1988) is a Spanish competitive swimmer and breaststroke specialist. She has a degree in Biomedicine from the Universitat Pompeu Fabra and has worked at Barcelona's Biomedical Research Center. She swims for Club Natació Sant Andreu, where she has trained for over five years with her coach Jordi Jou, ex-elite swimmer also for C.N. Sant Andreu. Besides elite training, she is also working towards her master's degree in Bioethics from the Universidad Católica de Murcia (UCAM).

Biography
Jessica Vall debuted internationally in the 2013 Mediterranean Games, where she swam the 200-meter breaststroke, 100-meter breaststroke, and 4 × 100 m medley relay. She won one gold and two silver medals.

She also took part in the 2013 World Aquatics Championships in the 50-meter and 200-meter breaststroke.

A year later, at the 2014 European Aquatics Championships, she won a bronze medal in the 200-meter breaststroke.

In the 2015 World Aquatics Championship in Kazan, Russia, Jessica took the bronze medal in the 200-meter breaststroke, setting a new Spanish record at 2:22:76. She tied for third with Danish swimmer Rikke Moller Pedersen and Chinese swimmer Shi Jinglin.

In 2016, at the Spanish Spring Open held in Sabadell from 19 to 22 March, Vall hit the Olympic minimum in the 100-meter breaststroke during her first swim, thus making her Spain's first member of the swim team going to the 2016 Summer Olympics. She also qualified for the 200-meter breaststroke later in that same meet. Her training partner at Club Natació Sant Andreu, teenage Africa Zamorano, was one of the surprises on the female Olympic squad, mainly made up of veterans: Mireia Belmonte, Melani Costa and Duane da Rocha.

Vall has been honored as Barcelona's "Female Athlete of the Year"  by Barcelona's City Council in 2015.

International Swimming League 
In 2019 Vall was member of the 2019 International Swimming League representing Team Iron.

References

External links

Jessica Vall bio on SwimSwam
Spanish Swimming Federation (RFEN)

1988 births
Swimmers from Catalonia
Spanish female breaststroke swimmers
Living people
World Aquatics Championships medalists in swimming
Swimmers at the 2016 Summer Olympics
Swimmers at the 2020 Summer Olympics
Olympic swimmers of Spain
Mediterranean Games gold medalists for Spain
Mediterranean Games silver medalists for Spain
Mediterranean Games bronze medalists for Spain
Swimmers at the 2013 Mediterranean Games
Swimmers at the 2018 Mediterranean Games
European Aquatics Championships medalists in swimming
Swimmers from Barcelona
Mediterranean Games medalists in swimming
21st-century Spanish women